Serena Michelle Best , is a British academic, and the Professor of Materials Science at the University of Cambridge.

Best has a BSc from the University of Surrey, and a PhD from the University of London. She was elected Fellow of the Royal Academy of Engineering (FREng) in 2012.

In the 2017 Birthday Honours, Best was made a CBE, "For services to Biomaterials Engineering."

As of January 2019, Best is President of the Institute of Materials, Minerals and Mining.

Selected publications
Araujo JV, Davidenko N, Danner M, Cameron RE, Best SM: Novel Porous scaffolds of pH Responsive Chitosan/Carrageenan-based Polyelectrolyte Complexes for Tissue Engineering. J Biomed Mater Res A. 2014 Feb 14.
Pawelec KM, Husmann A, Best SM, Cameron RE: Understanding anisotropy and architecture in ice-templated biopolymer scaffolds. Mater Sci Eng C Mater Biol Appl. 2014 Apr 1;37:141-7.
Pawelec KM, Husmann A, Best SM, Cameron RE: A design protocol for tailoring ice-templated scaffold structure. J R Soc Interface. 2014 Jan 8;11(92):20130958.
Shepherd JH, Ghose S, Kew SJ, Moavenian A, Best SM, Cameron RE: Effect of fiber crosslinking on collagen-fiber reinforced collagen-chondroitin-6-sulfate materials for regenerating load-bearing soft tissues. J Biomed Mater Res A. 2013 Jan;101(1):176-84.
Kew SJ, Gwynne JH, Enea D, Brookes R, Rushton N, Best SM, Cameron RE: Synthetic collagen fascicles for the regeneration of tendon tissue. Acta Biomater. 2012 Oct;8(10):3723-31.
Grover CN, Gwynne JH, Pugh N, Hamaia S, Farndale RW, Best SM, Cameron RE: Crosslinking and composition influence the surface properties, mechanical stiffness and cell reactivity of collagen-based films. Acta Biomater. 2012 Aug;8(8):3080-90.
Grover CN, Farndale RW, Best SM, Cameron RE: The interplay between physical and chemical properties of protein films affects their bioactivity. J Biomed Mater Res A. 2012 Sep;100(9):2401-11.
Grover CN, Cameron RE, Best SM: Investigating the morphological, mechanical and degradation properties of scaffolds comprising collagen, gelatin and elastin for use in soft tissue engineering. J Mech Behav Biomed Mater. 2012 Jun;10:62-74.

References

External links
Celebrating leading women in engineering: Professor Serena Best

Living people
Commanders of the Order of the British Empire
Alumni of the University of Surrey
Alumni of the University of London
British women academics
Fellows of St John's College, Cambridge
Fellows of the Royal Academy of Engineering
Female Fellows of the Royal Academy of Engineering
21st-century women engineers
Year of birth missing (living people)
Fellows of the Institute of Materials, Minerals and Mining